A scourge is a whip or flail.

Scourge may also refer to:
Scourge (Magic: The Gathering), an expansion set to Magic: The Gathering
USS Scourge (1812), an American schooner converted to a warship; sank during the War of 1812
"The Scourge" (Stargate SG-1), an episode of Stargate SG-1
Scourge (Transformers), one of four fictional characters in the Transformers series
Scourge of the Underworld a villain in Marvel Comics
Scourge, a trade name for a product that contains resmethrin
Scourge, an era in the fictional world of Earthdawn
Scourge, a cat character in the Warriors novel series
The Scourge, a fictional group introduced in "Hero", an episode of Angel
Scourge, a 2007 play by Marc Bamuthi Joseph
 Scourge: Outbreak,  third-person shooter video game.
 The Scourge (film), a 1922 British silent film
 Scourge (album)

See also
Scourge of the Underworld, an identity used by several vigilantes in the Marvel Comics universe
Cluny the Scourge, the main antagonist in Redwall by Brian Jacques
Scourge the Hedgehog in the Sonic the Hedgehog comic books
The Undead Scourge, a faction in the Warcraft series
"Scourge of the Seven Skies", Episode Seven of 2017 Nickelodeon show Mysticons